Marc Kevin Hill (born February 18, 1952) aka "The Booter" is a former Major League Baseball catcher for the St. Louis Cardinals (-), San Francisco Giants (-), Seattle Mariners (1980), and Chicago White Sox (-).

Hill played for the 1983 American League Western Division champion White Sox.

External links

1952 births
Living people
Major League Baseball catchers
Baseball players from Missouri
St. Louis Cardinals players
San Francisco Giants players
Seattle Mariners players
Chicago White Sox players
St. Petersburg Cardinals players
New York Yankees coaches
Houston Astros coaches
Major League Baseball bullpen coaches
Minor league baseball managers
People from Lincoln County, Missouri
Arkansas Travelers players
Cedar Rapids Cardinals players
Gulf Coast Cardinals players
Glens Falls White Sox players
Modesto Reds players
Tulsa Oilers (baseball) players